Jack Hubbert (19 March 1916 – 5 August 1990) was an Australian rules footballer who played with Essendon in the Victorian Football League (VFL).

Notes

External links 
		

1916 births
1990 deaths
Australian rules footballers from Victoria (Australia)
Essendon Football Club players